Alois Machatschek (born 25 November 1928 in Bratislava; died 5 May 2014 in Salzburg) was an Austrian architect, architectural historian, university professor and architectural preservationist.

Life 
Machatschek, the son of a builder, studied architecture at the Vienna College of Technology and then worked for Karl Holey as an assistant at the Institute for Architecture and Architectural Drawing. In 1961, he completed a doctorate. Among his early work was participation in the design of the Arthur-Schnitzler-Hof Gemeindebau in Döbling. In the 1960s, Machatschek devoted himself mainly to Mediterranean architectural history and received his habilitation for a work on tomb buildings in Rough Cilicia.

Machatschek was known above all for his cautious, high-quality restorations of historic buildings. After his habilitation, he devoted himself increasingly to Historic preservation. The restoration of the Schloss Rohrau, seat of the Harrach family, followed several projects for the Princely Family of Liechtenstein. Together with Wilfried Schermann, Machatschek conducted the renovations of the Palais Ferstel from 1978 to 1986 and the baroque Palais Caprara-Geymüller on Wallnerstraße, Vienna from 1986 to 1988. He was responsible for the reopening of Otto Wagner's  of the Wiener Stadtbahn as Line S 45 of the Vienna S-Bahn in 1987 after a decade of closure.

Selected publications
 1987. Bauforschungen in Selge. (Architectural Research in Selge; with Mario Schwarz, Josef Dorner und Fritz Schachermeyr)
 1988. Die Nekropolen und Grabmäler im Gebiet von Elaiussa Sebaste und Korykos im Rauhen Kilikien.  (The Necropoleis and Tomb Paintings in the Area of Elaiussa Sebaste and Korykos in Rough Cilicia)
 2001. Denkmalpflege in Europa. Der Europa-Preis für Denkmalpflege der Alfred Toepfer Stiftung.  (Architectural Preservation in Europe: The Alfred Toepfer Foundation Europe Prize for Architectural Preservation)

Bibliography 
  Alois Machatschek, Martin Kubelík, Mario Schwarz, Walter Frodl: Von der Bauforschung zur Denkmalpflege: Festschrift für Alois Machatschek zum 65. Geburtstag. Wien: Phoibos-Verlag 1993
 Mario Schwarz: "Editorial." In: Steine  Sprechen. No.138-139, November 2009, p. 2

External links 
 
 Mario Schwarz, Friedmund Hueber: Trauer um Alois Machatschek. Obituary on the website of the Österreichische Gesellschaft für Denkmal- und Ortsbildpflege.

20th-century Austrian architects
Academic staff of TU Wien
1928 births
2014 deaths
Czechoslovak emigrants to Austria
Architects from Bratislava